Faro is a municipality, the southernmost city and capital of the district of the same name, in the Algarve region of southern Portugal.

History 

The Ria Formosa lagoon attracted humans from the Palaeolithic age until the end of prehistory. The first settlements date from the fourth century BC, during the period of Phoenician colonization of the western Mediterranean. At the time, the area was known as Ossonoba, and was the most important urban centre of southern Portugal and commercial port for agricultural products, fish, and minerals.

Between the second and eighth centuries, the city was under the domain of the Romans, then the Byzantines, and later Visigoths, before being conquered by the Arabic-speaking Muslims known as Moors in 713. From the third century onwards and during the Visigothic period, it was the site of an Episcopal see, the Ancient Diocese of Ossonoba (306-688). The Byzantine presence has endured in the city walls' towers that were built during the Byzantine period.

With the advent of Moorish rule in the eighth century, Ossonoba retained its status as the most important town in the southwest corner of the Iberian Peninsula. In the 9th century, after a revolt led by Yahia Ben Bakr who was succeeded in office by his son, Bakr Ben Yahia, it became the capital of a short-lived princedom and was fortified with a ring of defensive walls. At this time, in the 10th century, the name Santa Maria  began to be used instead of Ossonoba. By the 11th century, the town was known as Santa Maria Ibn Harun.

During the Second Crusade soon after the Anglo-Norman forces took Lisbon in 1147 a detachment of this group sacked Faro, which was still by then under Muslim rule, on their way to the Holy Land.
Again in 1217, during the Fifth Crusade, a Frisian fleet of crusaders on their way to Acre, sacked and burned the city.

During the 500 years of Moorish rule, some Jewish residents of Faro made written copies of the Old Testament. The Moors were defeated and expelled in 1249 by the forces of the Portuguese King Afonso III. With the decline of the importance of the city of Silves (which was made the regional bishopric as Diocese of Silves shortly during and properly after the Reconquista), Faro took over the role of administration of the Algarve area.

Portuguese Kingdom

After Portuguese independence in 1143, Afonso Henriques and his successors began an expansion and Christian repopulation into the southern Iberian territory which had previously been occupied by the Moors. Following the conquest by D. Afonso III, in 1249, the Portuguese referred to the town as Santa Maria de Faaron or Santa Maria de Faaram. In the following years, the town became prosperous, due to its secure port and exploitation of salt. Consequently, by the beginning of the Portuguese Age of Discovery, the town was well positioned to become a leading commercial centre.

In the 14th century, the Jewish community began to grow in importance. In 1487, Samuel Gacon began printing the Pentateuco in Hebrew, the first book printed in Portugal. The Jewish community of Faro had long been a dominant force in the region, with many artisans and merchants contributing heavily to the economy and city development, but this level of prosperity was interrupted in December 1496 by an edict of Manuel I of Portugal, expelling those who did not convert to Christianity. As a result, officially, Jews no longer remained in Portugal. In the place of the Jewish village of Vila Adentro, the convent of Nossa Senhora da Assunção was founded and patronised by Queen Leonor, wife of the king.

Manuel I promoted the development and expansion of the city; 1499 had the construction of a hospital, the Church of Espírito Santo (or Church of the Misericórdia), a customshouse, and a slaughterhouse, all near the shoreline.

By 1540, John III of Portugal had elevated Faro to the status of city, then in 1577, the bishopric of the Algarve was transferred from Silves, which retains a co-cathedral, to the present Diocese of Faro.
 
In 1597, the city was sacked by English privateers led by Robert Devereux, 2nd Earl of Essex. The resultant fires damaged the walls, churches, and other buildings. At the same time, English troops seized the library of the Bishop of Faro, then Fernando Martins de Mascarenhas, which eventually became part of the collection of the University of Oxford's Bodleian Library. Among the looted books was the first printed book in Portugal: a Torah in local Hebrew (Judeo-Español), printed by Samuel Gacon at his workshop in Faro.

Throughout the 17th and 18th centuries, the city was expanded, with a series of walls during the period of the Restoration Wars (1640-1668), encompassing the semicircular front to the Ria Formosa.

The western city of Lagos had become the capital of the historical province of Algarve in 1577, but this all changed with the 1755 Lisbon earthquake. It affected many settlements across the Algarve, including Faro, which suffered damage to churches, convents (specifically the Convent of São Francisco and Convent of Santa Clara), and the episcopal palace, in addition to the walls, castle towers and bulwarks, barracks, guardhouses, warehouses, customshouses, and prison.

Much of the greater devastation across the coastal and lowland regions was caused by a tsunami, which dismantled fortresses and razed homes. Almost all the coastal towns and villages of the Algarve were heavily damaged by the tsunami, except Faro, protected by the sandy banks of the Ria Formosa lagoon. With the capital Lagos devastated, Faro became the administrative seat of the region the following year, 1756.

Geography 

The municipality of Faro is divided into two distinct areas, the coastline, part of the Parque Natural da Ria Formosa (Nature Park of Ria Formosa) and the barrocal, characterized by hills and valleys, populated with typical Algarvan vegetation.

It includes the river and a lagoon system, interspersed with dunes, forming a small islands and peninsulas, that protect a large area of marshes, channels, and islets. The beaches in Faro are situated on the peninsula of Ancão and island of Culatra, along the corridor of the nature park. The park is a rich and complex aquatic ecosystem, consisting of barrier islands, marshes, and channels, comprising sandy shorelines that separate the waters of the Ria Formosa and Atlantic Ocean. The beaches of Faro and Barrinha/Barra de São Luís, are located on the Ancão peninsula, the beach of Barreta on the Ilha Deserta, and the beaches of Farol and Culatra are located on the Ilha Culatra. The barrier islands are separated by tidal flats and shallows, including (from west to east) the Barra do Ancão/Barra de São Luís, the Barra de Santa Maria/Barra do Farol, and the Barra da Culatra/Barra da Armona (in the municipality of Olhão).

Annually, many species of aquatic migratory birds transient northern Europe and nest there during the winter. These include flamingos, terns, pied avocets, Eurasion wigeons, and common chaffinches.

Within the town are gardens and open spaces, among which are the Manuel Bivar Garden, Alameda João de Deus Garden, and the Mata do Liceu.

The variety of species and natural conditions result in the region being a popular ecotourism zone, promoting birdwatching, boating trips into the delta, kayaking along the Ria Formosa, pedestrian trails, and biking tours, accompanied by nature guides. The municipality is crossed by the southern Ecovia do Algarve, a bicycling circuit that connects the Algarve to the rest of Europe.

Climate 
Faro has a hot-summer Mediterranean climate (Köppen: Csa), moderated by a transitioning Portugal-Canary current giving a certain resemblance to Southern California that is not heated in the summer by the Mediterranean Sea like Algarve. Given this region is highly susceptible to the difference of precipitation throughout the seasons of the year, in the future scarcity of water could appear in conjunction with the increase of temperature and less incidence of rains.

Summer warmth can linger well into October. The city receives most of its rainfall over the winter; rain is scarce between June and September. Higher sea water temperatures are reached if the weather patterns produce a significant outflow of warmer surface water out of the Mediterranean which bathe the coastal Algarve with much warmer water.

With over 3000 hours of sunshine a year, Faro is often regarded as the sunniest city in Europe. July and August have the most sunshine, while December has the least.

Human geography 

Administratively, the municipality is divided into four civil parishes (freguesias):
 Faro (Sé e São Pedro)
 Conceição e Estoi
 Montenegro
 Santa Bárbara de Nexe

International relations

Faro is twinned with:

 Bolama, Guinea-Bissau
 Haikou, China
 Hayward, United States
 Huelva, Spain
 Maxixe, Mozambique
 Praia, Cape Verde
 Príncipe, São Tomé and Príncipe
 Tangier, Morocco

Transport 

Faro is served by a transport network connecting it to the Algarve, and by extension, other European markets. Faro is about 3 hours and 30 minutes by air from the principal European destinations, and 2 hours and 30 minutes from Lisbon, along the A2, and less than 1 hour from Andalusia, along the A22.

Through the International Airport, it receives millions of visitors annually, with 45 airlines serving this airport, including many low-cost airlines.  In recent years, the number of visitors travelling through the airport has increased as more and more low-cost airlines compete to offer cheap flights to the Algarve. The transport facilities to and from Faro airport and the centre of Faro include taxicabs and a bus line.

Faro is served by the centrally located Faro railway station, and a smaller halt in the east of the city at Bom João. The main station is operated by the national railway operator Comboios de Portugal (CP), which operates the Alfa Pendular, Intercidades and CP Regional routes, as well as a special service during the summer, the InterRegional line. The Alfa Pendular service connects Faro to the North and terminates in Porto. The Intercidades and InterRegional services connect Faro to Lisboa. The CP Regional service operates across the east and west Algarve and connects Faro to Lagos in the west Algarve, and Vila Real de Santo António in the east Algarve. Bom João is only served by the CP Regional trains heading east. Despite the proximity of Seville, it is not connected by train.

The town is served by a public transport network that include minibuses, local bus lines, and regional services across the Algarve.

Due to its position along the coast, a need exists to connect the shoreline communities with the outlying with various islands; with the exception of the island of Faro, most are accessible only by boat service. Throughout the year (from the commercial wharf or Portas do Mar wharf, depending on the time of year), regular and tourist services are operated along the estuary.

Culture and entertainment 
The Faro city holiday is on 7 September. The students' festival (Semana Académica da Universidade do Algarve), organized every year by students from the University of the Algarve, is also an important event in Faro.

The Faro motorcycle club is responsible for one of the largest motorcycle events in Portugal and Europe.

Sports 
A 30,000-seat stadium Estádio Algarve, shared by the cities of Faro and Loulé, was one of the venues of the Euro 2004 football championship. Louletano Desportos Clube (a club from the city of Loulé) and Sporting Clube Farense (from Faro) also use smaller municipal stadiums. The stadium is also used for concerts, festivals, and other events.

Notable people 

Bakr Ben Yahia, an important Marrano figure in Gharb al-Andalus
Madragana (born ca.1230) mistress to king Afonso III of Portugal
Francisco Barreto (1520–1573) a soldier, explorer and an officer in Morocco
José Maria da Ponte e Horta (1824–1892) a Portuguese noble, Governor of Angola, Macau and Mozambique
Sebastião Custódio de Sousa Teles (1847–1921) a senior politician and military officer
Maria Veleda (1871–1955) an educator, journalist and activist
Raul Pires Ferreira Chaves (1889–1967) a civil engineer and inventor
Adelino da Palma Carlos (1905–1992) the first Prime Minister of Portugal after the Carnation Revolution of 1974 
Carlos Quintas (born 1951) a stage and TV actor and singer
Sara Martins (born 1977) a Portuguese-born French actress of Cape Verdean descent
Diogo Piçarra (born 1990) a singer, won the Portuguese version of Pop Idol in 2012.

Sport 
Manuel Balela (born 1956) a football coach
José Rafael (born 1958) a retired footballer
Ana Dias (born 1974) a long-distance and marathon runner; four-time Olympian
Rui Machado (born 1984) a retired professional tennis player
Inês Murta (born 1997) a tennis player
Vitinha (born 2000) a Portuguese professional footballer

References 
Notes

Sources

External links 

 Official municipal website 

 
Municipalities of the Algarve
Towns of the Algarve
Cities in Portugal
Populated places in Faro District
Port cities and towns in Portugal
Seaside resorts in Portugal
Municipalities of Faro District
Phoenician colonies in Portugal